Next Episode (stylized in all caps) is the second extended play (EP) by South Korean brother-sister duo AKMU. It was released digitally on July 26, 2021, and physically on July 27, through YG Entertainment. The EP marks the duo's first album release in nearly two years, since Sailing in September 2019. Described as a "collaboration album", it comprises seven songs, with each track featuring a different artist. "Nakka" serves as the lead single for the album.

Background and release
South Korean brother-sister duo AKMU released the single "Happening" on November 16, 2020. In a press release for the song member Lee Chan-hyuk hinted that it was a potential prelude to their next full-length album. On June 27, 2021, South Korean news outlet Hankyung reported that the duo would be making a comeback in July, and had begun filming their new music video. On the same day, their agency YG Entertainment confirmed that they were in the middle of filming a music video for a new track. On July 12, the release of AKMU's new album titled Next Episode was announced for July 26.

On July 14, the EP's track listing was published, confirming a total of seven tracks with seven different featured artists. The track list highlighted "Nakka" featuring IU as the title track; other featuring artists included Lee Sun-hee, Zion.T, Beenzino, Choi Jung-hoon, Crush, and Sam Kim. Two days later, a video trailer for the EP was released, with YG Entertainment announcing that each track on the album would be accompanied by its own music video.

Critical reception

Ruby C from the British magazine NME gave the EP a five-star rating out of five, and said, "Much like a mountainous expedition, there are always risks that come with collaborating with others, but those in 'Next Episode' work for the better: each track brings out the strengths of the collaborators, while still effective in showcasing Su-hyun's flawless, pristine vocals and Chan-hyuk's adept lyrical storytelling." Tamar Herman, writing for South China Morning Post, said that "[b]etween the captivating musicality and the lyrics' compelling themes", the album is "worth listening to again and again."

Commercial performance
EP's lead single "Nakka" debuted at number three on Gaon Digital Chart for the week ending July 31, 2021. The following week, "Nakka" rose to the number one spot, becoming the duo's seventh number one single on the chart. It debuted at number 16 on the Billboard K-pop 100, and peaked at number one for the chart issued on August 14; and remained atop for four consecutive weeks.

Accolades

Track listing

Credits and personnel
Credits adapted from YG Select.

 AKMU – vocals 
 Lee Chan-hyuk – vocals , lyrics , composition 
 Lee Su-hyun – vocals 
 Beenzino – vocals , lyrics , chorus 
 Koo Bon-am – bass 
 Crush – vocals 
 Lim Heon-il – acoustic guitar , electric guitar 
 Lee Hyun-young – composition , arrangement , keyboard , synthesizer 
 IU – vocals 
 Park Jae-bum – drum , percussion 
 Park Jong-woo (PJnotreble) – bass 
 Jukjae – composition , arrangement , acoustic guitar , electric guitar , bass , drum 
 Yoon Jun-hyun - synthesizer 
 Choi Jung-hoon – vocals 
 Millennium – composition , arrangement , drum , synthesizer , programming , sampling and editing , bass , keyboard , effects , percussion 
 Peejay – composition , arrangement , drum , keyboard , percussion , chorus 
 Sam Kim – vocals 
 Kim Seung-hyun (Shyun) – electric guitar 
 Sihwang – composition , arrangement , electric guitar , electric bass , synthesizer 
 Chung Soo-wan – electric guitar 
 Lee Sun-hee – vocals 
 Zion.T – vocals

Charts

Sales

Release history

Notes

References

2021 EPs
AKMU albums
Korean-language EPs
YG Entertainment EPs